Seth Gabel (born October 3, 1981) is an American actor. He is known for his roles of agent Lincoln Lee on Fox's television series Fringe, Cotton Mather on WGN America's series Salem, and Adrian Moore on the FX series Nip/Tuck. He is a grand-nephew of actor Martin Gabel.

Early life and education
Gabel was born to a Jewish family in Hollywood, Florida. He was raised under the surname of his stepfather, who adopted him, Cosentino. He finished his high school from University School of Nova Southeastern University in Davie, Florida, in 1999 and from New York University's Tisch School of the Arts. It was during his youth, where he met his best friend Josh Gad.

Career
Gabel starred in the Universal Pictures coming-of-age drama, Take Me Home Tonight and appeared in the 2006 film version of Dan Brown’s novel, The Da Vinci Code, directed by his father-in-law, Ron Howard. Television credits include recurring and guest starring roles on United States of Tara, The Closer, Law & Order: Special Victims Unit, CSI: Crime Scene Investigation, Sex and the City, and 100 Centre Street, directed by Sidney Lumet. He starred in Dirty Sexy Money as Jeremy Darling, the charming, rebellious, and exceedingly idiosyncratic son of the privileged and powerful Darling family, and the fraternal twin of socialite Juliet Darling, played by Samaire Armstrong.

Gabel won praise for his portrayal of Adrian Moore, the sexually confused adopted son of Ava Moore (portrayed by Famke Janssen) on the FX series Nip/Tuck. The story arc depicting their incestuous and emotionally abusive relationship garnered much attention.

Gabel first appeared on the FOX series Fringe during the 2010–11 TV season. He was promoted to the main cast for the fourth season. The character was written off at the end of that season before returning briefly for the series finale.

On January 30, 2013, Gabel was cast in the episode "Vertigo" of the series Arrow as a character based on Count Vertigo, known as the Count. He played Cotton Mather in Salem. In 2015, Gabel was cast as Jeffrey Dahmer in American Horror Story: Hotel. In 2019 he appeared in an episode of Showtime’s  Billions opposite Damian Lewis.

Personal life
Gabel met actress Bryce Dallas Howard at New York University, and they dated for five years before marrying on June 17, 2006, in Greenwich, Connecticut. They have two children: son Theodore Norman Howard-Gabel (born February 16, 2007), and daughter Beatrice Jean Howard-Gabel (born January 19, 2012).

Filmography

Film

Television

Video games

Awards and nominations

References

External links

 

1981 births
Male actors from Florida
American male film actors
American male television actors
Jewish American male actors
Living people
NSU University School alumni
Tisch School of the Arts alumni
People from Hollywood, Florida
21st-century American male actors
Howard acting family